Drepanogynis curvaria is a species of moth of the family Geometridae first described by Hermann Dewitz in 1881. It is found in South Africa.

References

Dewitz, 1881. Afrikanische Nachtschmetterlinge. Nova acta Leopoldina Bd. 42, no. 2

Endemic moths of South Africa
Ennominae
Moths of Africa